Parnera is a census town in Valsad district in the Indian state of Gujarat.

Geography
It has an average elevation of 44 metres (144 feet).

Demographics
 India census, Parnera had a population of 10,713. Males constitute 54% of the population and females 46%. Parnera has an average literacy rate of 79%, higher than the national average of 59.5%: male literacy is 85%, and female literacy is 72%. In Parnera, 10% of the population is under 6 years of age.

Tourism
Neary the village, there is a hill called Parnera Hill. Every October a fair is organized on Parnera Hill.

References

Cities and towns in Valsad district